Martha Diaz is a Colombian-American community organizer, media producer, archivist, curator, and social entrepreneur.

Career
Diaz started her career as an intern working for Ted Demme on the cable show Yo! MTV Raps. Diaz has associate produced several documentaries including, Black August directed by Dream Hampton, Where My Ladies At? directed by Leba Haber-Rubinoff, and Nas: Time Is Illmatic directed by One9. In 2002, Diaz founded the H2O International Film Festival with a dozen filmmakers, entertainment industry professionals, activist, and artists.

Diaz has been a guest curator at NJ Performing Arts Center, the Schomburg Center for Research in Black Culture - New York Public Library, Museum of the Moving Image, and the Academy of Motion Pictures Arts and Sciences.

Diaz was a part-time professor at New York University's Gallatin School from 2011 to 2015.

Diaz in collaboration with Marcella Runell Hall created the "Hip-Hop Education Guidebook: Volume 1", a comprehensive collection of lesson plans and resources that educators can use to integrate hip-hop into their classroom curriculum. The book concept was inspired by Diaz, who founded and curated the Hip-Hop Education Summit with Patricia Wang from 2003 to 2005.  In 2010, Diaz formed the Hip-Hop Education Center (H2ED) to formalize and unify the field of hip-hop based education.

Diaz conducted the first national study on hip-hop education programs and initiatives in partnership with Pedro Noguera and Edward Fergus. Diaz was a fellow at the Lemelson Center for the Study of Invention and Innovation at the National Museum of American History  (Smithsonian Institution).  In 2008, Diaz was the recipient of the Catherine B. Reynolds Fellowship in Social Entrepreneurship. In September 2014, Diaz was selected as a Community Scholar at Columbia University.

Diaz served as chair and executive director of the Hip-Hop Association, a community building 501(c)(3) non-profit organization. The Hip-Hop Association received a Union Square Arts Award, which recognizes the central leadership role played by arts and culture in providing educational opportunities for young people, building collaborations and promoting social change.

In 2017, Diaz was selected as a Nasir Jones Fellow at The Hiphop Archive and Research Institute in The Hutchins Center for African and African American Research at Harvard University. She was also invited to be a 2020 Civic Media Fellow at the Annenberg Innovation Lab at the University of California.

References

External links
Martha Diaz Website
Hip-Hop Education Center Website

1969 births
Living people
New York University faculty
Hip hop people